Miriclytus is a genus of beetles in the family Cerambycidae, containing the following species:

 Miriclytus miri (Galileo & Martins, 2007)
 Miriclytus quadrifasciatus (Chevrolat, 1862)
 Miriclytus triangularis Martins & Galileo, 2011

References

Clytini